Benjamin Lands (February 22, 1921 – January 13, 2014) was a Canadian basketball player who competed in the 1948 Summer Olympics. Lands was born in Montreal. He was part of the Canadian basketball team which finished ninth in the Olympic tournament. Lands was affiliated with the Montréal Young Men's Hebrew Association.

Early life
Lands was born in Montreal, Quebec but lived in Winnipeg.

References

External links
profile
Bennie Lands' obituary

1921 births
2014 deaths
Anglophone Quebec people
Basketball players from Montreal
Basketball players at the 1948 Summer Olympics
Basketball position missing
Canadian men's basketball players
Jewish men's basketball players
Jewish Canadian sportspeople
Olympic basketball players of Canada